Laporje is a settlement southeast of Turjak in the Municipality of Velike Lašče in central Slovenia. It is included in the Central Slovenia Statistical Region. The area is part of the traditional region of Lower Carniola.

Name
Laporje was first attested in written sources in 1436 as Lappriach (and as Lapriach in 1463 and again as Lappriach in 1476). The name is derived from the Slovene common noun lapor 'marl', referring to the characteristics of the local soil. The place name is now a singular neuter form but, based on the locative plurals reflected in the medieval transcriptions, it was probably originally the plural demonym *Lapor′ane (literally, 'people living on marly soil').

Gallery

References

External links

Laporje on Geopedia

Populated places in the Municipality of Velike Lašče